St Bede's Catholic School and Sixth Form College is a coeducational secondary school and sixth form with academy status, located in Lanchester, County Durham, England. It has a main block, a language block, a technology/music block, the sixth form block, two fields, tennis/basketball court and an astroturf. On 1 June 2012, the school converted from secondary to academy, giving it independence from the local authority. The school is currently owned and operated by Bishop Wilkinson Catholic Education Trust, and has been fully integrated since mid-2020.

The school opened its new sixth-form centre in November 2007 following a £5 million refurbishment, which included construction work on the new building and rebuilding science laboratories. Sir Tom Cowie, who lived in Lanchester, donated £500,000 to the project, which was named in his honour. St Bede's is frequently cited as the top-performing school in County Durham.

Notable former pupils
Peter Dunphy, film producer and politician
Anne McElvoy, journalist

References

External links 
School website

Secondary schools in County Durham
Catholic secondary schools in the Diocese of Hexham and Newcastle
Academies in County Durham
Lanchester, County Durham